San Agustín Tlaxiaca is a town and one of the 84 municipalities of Hidalgo, in central-eastern Mexico. The municipality covers an area of 354.6 km2.

As of 2005, the municipality had a total population of 27,118.

Geography 
San Agustín Tlaxiaca borders. It covers a total surface area of 354.6 km2. The total municipality extends 96.37 and borders with the municipalities of Ajacuba, Actopan, Pachuca, El Arenal, Mineral del Chico, Zapotlán de Juárez, Tolcayuca and the state of México (Hueypoxtla).

The town of San Agustín Tlaxiaca, a municipal seat, has governing jurisdiction over the following communities: Ixcuinquitlapilco, San Juan Solis, and Pozos.

Demography

Populated places in San Agustín Tlaxiaca

References 

Municipalities of Hidalgo (state)
Populated places in Hidalgo (state)
Populated places in the Teotlalpan